= Malcolm Donaldson =

British physician-accoucheur (1884–1973)

Malcolm Donaldson FRCS FRCOG (27 April 1884 – 16 March 1973) was a British physician-accoucheur at St Bartholomew's Hospital, London, and director of the cancer department there.

== Life and career ==
Donaldson was born on 27 April 1884. He studied medicine at the University of Cambridge, qualifying (MB BCh) in 1912. During the World War I, he served as an officer with the Royal Army Medical Corps. After the war, he led efforts to promote national cancer education for the public, but his efforts met with resistance.

Donaldson was vice-chairman of the National Radium Commission, a member of the Radiology Committee of the Medical Research Council, and a founding fellow of the Royal College of Obstetricians and Gynaecologists.
